Epicephala lanceolaria is a leafflower moth of the family Gracillariidae. The only known host of the larva is Glochidion lanceolarium which is pollinated by the imago (flying moth).

Distribution
The moth is endemic to China and found in the provinces of Guangdong, Hainan and Hong Kong. It was described in 2012 from the type locality taken from the South China Botanical Garden.

Biology
The eggs are laid in April and May on the flowers of Glochidion lanceolarium, with the adult moth pollinating the plant at the same time. G lanceolarium differs from other leafflower trees by producing their fruit in January and the larvae emerge from the eggs, at that time, to feed within the fruit. The larvae pupate within the mature fruit in March and the moths fly out in the following months to lay eggs on the newly emerged flowers.

References

External links
Youtube video of an Epicephala lanceolaria pollinating and laying eggs in a Glochidion lanceolarium flower

Epicephala
Moths described in 2012
Endemic fauna of China
Moths of Asia